Entreviñas may refer to:
Entreviñas (Avilés)
Entreviñas (Narcea)